Hamburger Sparkasse AG (Haspa) is one of 5 free public savings banks in Germany based in Hamburg. With a balance sheet total of around 41.9 billion euros and about 5,000 employees, it is the largest savings bank in Germany. It was founded in 1827 in the legal form of the old Hamburg law. In 2003 the bank was separated to a stock corporation and the original Hamburger Sparkasse changed its name to Haspa Finanzholding.

Corporate structure 
Hamburger Sparkasse is a non-listed stock corporation. The legal basis of the Sparkasse is the Haspa statutes.

Services 
Haspa provides the universal banking business as a savings bank. According to its data, it is the market leader in the Hamburg Metropolitan Region for the private and medium-sized corporate clients. In contrast to most other savings banks, it is not subject to a savings bank law, but as a stock corporation it is subject to the German stock corporation law. Organs of the Sparkasse are the board of directors, the supervisory board, the general meeting and various advisory boards. Haspa Finanzholding is the only shareholder.

The savings bank is divided into different central areas. This includes:

 Retail customers
 Corporate banking
 Private banking
It has around 200 branches and customer centres. Other competence centres are dedicated to business start-ups, complex real estate transactions and large customer business. Haspa operates a total of around 370 ATMs in the greater Hamburg area.

Hamburger Sparkasse AG also has stakes in the following companies:

 Haspa BGM - investment company for medium-sized companies
 GBP Company for company pension planning mbH
 Wincor Nixdorf Portavis GmbH
 Hanseatic Savings Banks and Giro Association

Business alignment 
As a savings bank, Haspa operates the universal banking business. According to its own information, it is the market-leading bank in the Hamburg metropolitan region for private customers and medium-sized corporate customers.

History 
Against the background of the end of the Napoleonic era and the reorganization of political conditions in Europe by the Congress of Vienna, the "Hamburger Sparkasse von 1827" was founded by Hamburg citizens on the initiative of Senator Amadeus Augustus Abendroth. In the spirit of Hanseatic merchants, this was done without a contribution from the city. Surprisingly, it was soon found that not only the financially disadvantaged population was investing their money, but also business people, craftsmen and other tradespeople appeared. This showed that the population had independently modified the original concept of a "poor savings bank".

In the first few years, a business policy was pursued under the slogan “Sparkasse for the smallest amounts”, the primary goal of which was limited to deposits of 8 to 30 Kurant-Marks (at that time the common Hamburg currency), which earned interest at 3⅛ percent. The business was initially modest, with two paid employees (bookkeeper and messenger) and six volunteers who were responsible for the deposits and withdrawals. The spatial presence was initially limited to two furnished offices: one each in the town hall and one in the Eimbeck house.

From 1847 to 1848, the Hamburg architects Hermann Peter Fersenfeldt and Carl Friedrich Reichardt, built today's Sparkasse building, which was initially used as the Reichsbank headquarters, at Adolphsplatz 2 in Hamburg, directly across from the Hamburg Stock Exchange.

A special turning point for the then young Sparkasse occurred in 1864. Due to differences in the management board of Haspa in connection with the abolition of the maximum deposit limit - now amounting to 60 marks - the two retired members of the board, Rudolf Martin and F. E. Schlueter, founded the "Neue Sparcasse von 1864" together with Senator Eduard Johns.

This division lasted into the second half of the 20th century. It was not until 1968 that the first steps in the merger of the two savings banks, which took place in 1972, were finally taken, with the decisive efforts of the board spokesman Peter Mählmann. In contrast to the majority of savings banks in Germany under public law, the new “Hamburger Sparkasse” continued to be constituted as a “legal person under old Hamburg law”, as a private savings bank.

An important step in the development of Haspa in the 1980s came with the end of the so-called savings bank war between Haspa and the state of Schleswig-Holstein. This particularly concerned a conflict in which the Hamburger Sparkasse was prohibited from opening further branches in the communities in Schleswig-Holstein bordering Hamburg. This legal dispute went up to the Federal Administrative Court on a legal level. This highest authority gave Haspa the right: It is allowed to open branches in the Hamburg area. On that day, the banking operations of Hamburger Sparkasse were transferred to a stock corporation and the company under old Hamburg law was renamed "Haspa Finanzholding".

References 

Article contains translated text from Hamburger Sparkasse on the German Wikipedia retrieved on 7 March 2017.

External links 

Homepage
 

Banks of Germany
Banks established in 1827
German companies established in 1827
Banks under direct supervision of the European Central Bank